Bogdan Ciufulescu (born 1 April 1970) is a Romanian former wrestler who competed in the 1996 Summer Olympics.

References

External links
 

1970 births
Living people
Olympic wrestlers of Romania
Wrestlers at the 1996 Summer Olympics
Romanian male sport wrestlers